Pritam Bhartwan is a folk singer from Uttarakhand, India. In 2019, he was conferred the Padma Shri honour by the president of India, Ram Nath Kovind, for his contribution to the field of traditional folk art. He also known as jagar Samrat in Uttarakhand. He has received many awards by State government and central government. He is also visiting professor in Cincinnati University and University of Illinois University.

Life 
Bhartwan was born in a village in Raipur, Uttarakhand. He began performing folk songs at the age of 13, along with his uncle. His songs follows the Jagar tradition of music.

Since 2011, he has been a guest lecturer at the University of Illinois. He has recorded over 1,000 folk songs. In 2019, he was honoured with the Padma Shri award by the President of India.

Jagar is a sacred vocal tradition generally sung to please the goddess or god or some time to worship nature in the form of humans and ancestors. Bhartwan belongs to the sect of the special folk singer locally called as Jagariya.
He is considered one of the top singers of Uttarakhand, India. He has recorded almost 30 albums and more than 
1000 songs from different platforms.

References

External links 
 Pritam Bhartwan Official Youtube Channel

Indian folk musicians
Folk artists from India
Living people
Recipients of the Padma Shri in arts
1949 births